Route 385 is a  long mostly east–west secondary highway in the northwest portion of New Brunswick, Canada.

The route's North-Eastern terminus starts at the northern entrance of Mount Carleton Provincial Park. The road travels south through Mount Carleton Provincial Park following the Tobique River south-west to the community of Nictau.  The road continues south continuing to follow the Tobique River to the community of Riley Brook, then Blue Mountain Brook which is across the river from the Blue Mountain Natural Protected Area then passing through Two Brooks.  The road continues south passing the communities of Everett, Oxbow, Burntland Brook, Sisson Brook, Mapleview, Weaver before ending in the community of Plaster Rock where the highway is known as Main Street ending at Route 108 and Route 109 intersection.

History

Intersecting routes
None

See also

References

385
385